Antonci is a small village close to Poreč in the Croatian region of Istria (Istria County). The population is 164 (2011 census).

See also
 Barbariga, Croatia

References

Populated places in Istria County
Italian-speaking territorial units in Croatia